Jean Charles Antoine Van Gool (28 January 1931 – 13 July 1986) was a French professional footballer who played as a goalkeeper.

Honours 
Lille

 Division 2: 1963–64
 Coupe de France: 1954–55
 Coupe Charles Drago runner-up: 1956

References 

1931 births
1986 deaths
Sportspeople from Nord (French department)
French footballers
Association football goalkeepers
Lille OSC players
Ligue 1 players
Ligue 2 players
Footballers from Hauts-de-France